Oh Dad, Poor Dad, Mamma's Hung You in the Closet and I'm Feelin' So Sad: A Pseudoclassical Tragifarce in a Bastard French Tradition was the first play written by Arthur Kopit.

Background
Kopit was on a postgraduate scholarship from Harvard University when he entered the play in a playwriting contest. The play won the contest and an undergraduate production at Harvard, and gained the notice of the Phoenix Theatre in New York. Kopit explained: "I had been writing short stories, and I was having a lot of trouble with the narrative point of view. When I wrote a play, I found that I lost myself as Arthur Kopit and I just wrote down what the characters said. I wasn’t anywhere in the play, and I liked that. In my fiction I was everywhere, and I didn’t like that."

Productions
The play opened Off-Broadway at the Phoenix Repertory Theatre on February 26, 1962. The cast featured 
Jo Van Fleet (Madame Rosepettle), Austin Pendleton (Jonathan) and Barbara Harris (Rosalie). The play transferred to Broadway at the Morosco Theatre on August 27, 1963, and closed on October 5, 1963. The principal roles were originated on Broadway by Hermione Gingold (Madame Rosepettle), Sam Waterston (Jonathan, her awkward son), Alix Elias (Rosalie, seductive babysitter), and Sándor Szabó (Commodore Roseabove). The director was Jerome Robbins. Kopit won the 1962 Drama Desk Award for the production.

The play was turned into a film of the same name in 1967 starring Rosalind Russell, Robert Morse and Barbara Harris and directed by Richard Quine. In the film version, Harris reprised her role of Rosalie from the 1962 Off-Broadway version of the play.

Plot
Described by the author as a "farce in three scenes", the story involves an overbearing mother who travels to a luxury resort in the Caribbean, bringing along her son and her deceased husband, preserved and in his casket.

References

External links
 
 

Plays by Arthur Kopit
1963 plays
1960s debut plays
American plays adapted into films